Colton is an unincorporated community in Cheyenne County, Nebraska, United States.

History 
A post office was established at Colton in 1887, and remained in operation until it was discontinued in 1901. Colton was named for Francis Colton, a Union Pacific Railroad ticket agent.

References

Populated places in Cheyenne County, Nebraska
Unincorporated communities in Nebraska